The 2022–23 season is the 58th season in the history of FC Twente and their fourth consecutive season in the top flight. The club are participating in the Eredivisie, the KNVB Cup, and the UEFA Europa Conference League.

Players

First-team squad

Transfers

Pre-season and friendlies

Competitions

Overall record

Eredivisie

League table

Results by round

Matches 
The league fixtures were announced on 17 June 2022.

KNVB Cup

UEFA Europa Conference League

Third qualifying round 
The draw for the third qualifying round was held on 18 July 2022.

Play-off round 
The draw for the play-off round was held on 2 August 2022.

Notes

References

FC Twente seasons
Twente
Twente